Scholars Pavilion or Scholars Chartagi is a monument donated by the nation of Iran to the United Nations Office at Vienna. The monument architecture is Persian Achaemenid architecture, with Persian columns and other features from Persepolis and other remains from the Achaemenids. The Chahartaq pavilion form runs through Iranian architecture from pre-Islamic times to the present.

Statues of Central Asian medieval scholars, Omar Khayyam, Al-Biruni, Abu Bakr al-Razi and Avicenna (Ibn-e-Sina or Pour Sina) are inside the pavilion. This monument donated in June 2009 in occasion of Iran's peaceful developments in science. This monument was designed by Alireza Nazem Alroaya and constructed by Sadeh Architecture City Construction.

Gallery

References

Foreign relations of Iran
Monuments and memorials in Austria
Cultural infrastructure completed in 2009
Avicenna
Omar Khayyam
Al-Biruni
Muhammad ibn Zakariya al-Razi